The 2014–15 EuroChallenge was the 12th and last edition of Europe's third-tier level transnational competition for men's professional basketball clubs. The winner and the runner-up of this competition earned a place at the group stage of next year's Eurocup season.

The regular season was composed by 32 teams and it started on 4 November 2014. The season ended on 26 April 2015, when JSF Nanterre beat Trabzonspor Medical Park 63–64 in the Final in Trabzon, Turkey.

It was the last season of the EuroChallenge, starting from the 2015–16 season, the competition was replaced by the FIBA Europe Cup.

Competition format
As in the previous season, the 32 participants were divided into two conferences. Teams were divided into eight round-robin groups of four teams each for the regular season. The two best-placed teams qualified to the next phase of the competition.

Teams
No qualification rounds were played, all teams entered the regular season. FIBA Europe announced the participants on 1 July 2014. One day later, Szolnoki Olaj and VEF Rīga were moved to 2014–15 Eurocup as a replacement of two withdrawals. Trabzonspor Medical Park and Enisey Krasnoyarsk replaced them in the EuroChallenge.
The labels in the parentheses show how each team qualified for the place of its starting round. (TH: Title holder)
 1st, 2nd, 3rd, 4th, 5th, etc.: League position after eventual playoffs

Draw
The draw for the regular season was held on 6 July in Munich, Germany.

The 32 clubs registered for this year's competition were divided into two conferences (1 and 2), based on broad geographical criteria.

Conference 1

Conference 2

Regular season
The 32 teams are drawn into eight groups of four. In each group, teams play against each other home-and-away in a round-robin format. The group winners and runners-up advance to the last 16, while the third-placed teams and fourth-placed teams are eliminated.

If teams in the same group finished tied on points at the end of the regular season, tiebreakers were applied in the following order:
 Head-to-head record.
 Head-to-head point differential.
 Point differential during the regular season.
 Points scored during the regular season.
 Sum of quotients of points scored and points allowed in each regular season match.

Group A

Group B

Group C

Group D

Group E

Group F

Group G

Group H

Last 16
The sixteen teams were divided in four groups of four. In each group, teams play against each other home-and-away in a round-robin format. The group winners and runners-up advance to the quarterfinals, while the third-placed teams and fourth-placed teams are eliminated.

Group I

Group J

Group K

Group L

Quarterfinals

Final Four

The 2015 Final Four was played on 24 April and 26 April 2015 at Hayri Gür Arena, Trabzon, Turkey.

Awards

Final Four MVP
 Jamal Shuler (JSF Nanterre)

Top Statistical Performer
Each round a Weekly MVP is chosen, determined by the Performance Index Rating (PIR) system.

Regular season

Last 16

Quarterfinals

Individual statistics

To be included in the top rankings in individual statistics, a player had to have a minimum of 9 games played.

Points

Rebounds

Assists

Season highs

See also
2014–15 Euroleague
2014–15 Eurocup Basketball

References

 
FIBA EuroChallenge seasons
EuroChallenge